Moula-Ali commonly known as Moula Ali . It is a well-developed industrial and urban area in Malkajgiri Mandal, of the Medchal-Malkajgiri district, It is a part of Greater Hyderabad and also a part of Hyderabad Metropolitan Region of the Indian state of Telangana, This area is well connected with rail transportation through the Moula Ali Railway Station. 
 It is noted for its Moula Ali hill, on top of which stands the Moula Ali Dargah and mosque, dedicated to Ali.

This was built during the era of the Qutb Shahi rulers. The Moula Ali Dargah is one of the 11 heritage sites identified by the Heritage Conservation Committee of HUDA. It is basically a large rocky area, with undulating terrain. There is another hillock opposite the Moula Ali Hill, called "Qadm-e-Rasool" on which the sacred relics of the Prophet were supposedly deposited by Mohammad Shakrullah Rehan, a servant of Asaf Jahi.

History
Maula Ali Dargah and Maula Ali Arch of Hyderabad came into existence during the Qutb Shahi dynasty. According to British historian William Dalrymple’s accounts, a senior eunuch, Yaqut, in Qutb Shah’s court was asleep, when a man in green robes appeared in a dream and revealed himself as Maula Ali (husband of Fatima, daughter of the Prophet Mohammed). Yaqut followed him up to the summit of a hill, where he fell down before the Maula Ali, who was resting his right hand upon a rock. Before he could say anything Yaqut found himself awake.

Yaqut set off from Golconda in search of the holy hill, and finally found it along with the mark of Maula Ali’s handprint branded on the rock. The hand mark was hewn out of the rock and placed in the great arch built at the site.
 
The highly revered Shi’ite site is not just limited to the devotion of Shia Muslims; the Qutb Shahi tradition of annual celebrations commemorating Yaqut’s dream was also continued and patronised by Sunni Asaf-Jahi Nizams. Many great officials and courtiers of Nizam’s regime were of the Shi’ite sect. Prime minister and minister of Nizam Ali Khan, Aristu Jah and Mir Alam are few of the notable Shia Muslims. Ma Laqa Bhai Chanda, Tawaif if Nizam Ali khan’s court was a notable devotee of the Maula Ali Dargah. Ma Laqa Bhai was buried near the shrine, alongside her mother, Raj Kanwar Bhai’s burial site.

Moula-Ali is believed to have been inhabited since megalithic times. Iron Age burial sites have been discovered in Moula-Ali. The earliest excavations were carried out in 1935 by the then-Department of Archaeology of the Nizam’s Dominion. During the Nizam era, Moula-Ali was a very prominent area, with places like the Hyderabad Race Club located here. Later in 1886 it was shifted to Malakpet. This shift was carried out for the convenience of H.H. Nawab Mir Mahboob Ali Khan, VIth Nizam (seen in the picture on left with Moula Ali Kaman in the background). In 1954, the first open prison was opened at Moula Ali. It was later shifted to Cherlaplly.

The famous rowdy sheeter Chand terrorized this region. He was involved in selling Wakf board properties illegally to many Andhra builders. He died after having a massive heart attack.

Overview 

The major neighbourhoods are Moula Ali hill, Kamala Nagar, A.S. Rao Nagar, Anand Bagh, DAE Colony etc. Kushaiguda bus depot is also located close to Moula-Ali.  A large housing project by Andhra Pradesh Housing Board was established in Moula Ali. This colony is now popularly called APHB colony.

Industrial area 

Various industries are located in and around Moula Ali. The Nuclear Fuel Complex and ECIL are some of the prominent facilities located near Moula Ali. The Republic Forge Company Limited, owned by the state government was also located here, though it was declared bankrupt and shut down. Moula Ali is a major centre for Indian railways, with various facilities like the electric loco-shed located here. Hyderabad Chemicals and Fertilizers was established in Moula-Ali in 1942, but by 1982, the company was declared sick and sold off to a private company.  In 1961, Andhra Foundry and Machine Company Limited was established in Moula Ali.  Moula-Ali Industrial Estate, with several small and medium scale industries, is located also here.

A division of Union Carbide, manufacturing Eveready batteries is also located at Moula-Ali. HMT Bearings Ltd (formerly Indo-Nippon Precision Bearings Ltd) also has a division in Moula-Ali. A major training centre for Railway Protection Force, Indian Railways Institute for Signal and Telecommunication Engineering and the Zonal Training School (ZTS) of South Central Railway are also located at Moula Ali.

Transport 
Moula-Ali has well-connected buses operated by Telangana State Road Transport Corporation (TSRTC), which ply on two routes covering most of the area. Kushaiguda Bus Depot is located adjacent to Moula-Ali.
However, most of the major trains do not have a stop here. The nearest MMTS Train station is at Sitaphalmandi Railway Station.

The 250-year-old Moula Ali Kamaan (an arch) was declared unsafe by the Archeology Department and the Roads and Buildings Department decided not to allow traffic through it temporarily but to instead divert it through APHB Colony. Moula Ali Kamaan was restored in 2013 and traffic was permitted to use it again, with the exception of heavy vehicles.

Sub-regions of Moula Ali 

Moula Ali is divided into 4 regions: Old Moula Ali, Ecil Extension, Upparguda, and Meerpet (also known as IDA Moula Ali).

Old Moula Ali 

 Moula Ali Hill
 Bagh -e- Hydri
 Parvathi Nagar
 Maruthi Nagar
 Sharmika Nagar
 New Maruthi Nagar
 Chanda Bagh
 MJ Colony
 Saddulla Nagar
 Mughal Colony
 Gandhi Nagar
 Gayathri Nagar
 Ulfat Nagar
 Andal Nagar
 Hanuman Nagar
 Kasthurba Nagar
 Bharath Nagar

IDA Moula Ali /Meerpet 
 Venkateswara Nagar
 VNR Enclave
 Musi Nagar
 Gopal Nagar
 Sai Delux Nagar
 Raghavendra Nagar
 Vasantha Vihar Colony
 Jawahar Nagar
 Mangapuram
 Kailasa giri
 APHB Colony
 Krishna Nagar
 Indra Nagar
 Meerpet
 APIIC Colony
 New Srinagar Colony
 Satyagiri Colony 
 Green Hills Colony
 Adarsh Nagar
 ICRISAT Colony
 CIEFL Colony
 Shiridi Nagar
 New Sri Nagar Colony

ECIL Extension 

 Rao Nagar Colony
 SP Nagar
 Vasanth Vihar Colony

Upparguda

 Upparguda
 Raja Nagar
 Kalyan Nagar
 NMDC Colony
 Sanjay Gandhi Nagar
 Moula Ali Railway Quarters 
 Prashanth Nagar
 Ambedkar Nagar (Esuka Bavi)

References

External links

Neighbourhoods in Hyderabad, India
Cities and towns in Hyderabad district, India